Sneakin' Suspicion was  the fourth album by Dr. Feelgood, and was released in 1977. During recording of Sneakin' Suspicion, the band nearly disbanded following the departure of guitarist, songwriter and focal point, Wilko Johnson.
The album reached number 10 in the UK Albums Chart in June 1977, and remained in that chart for six  weeks. It also spawned their first single to enter the corresponding UK Singles Chart - "Sneakin' Suspicion".

Despite its thriving British success, Dr. Feelgood was unable to find an audience in the United States. After Sneakin' Suspicion they did not release another record in the U.S. until 1980.

Track listing
All tracks composed by Wilko Johnson; except where indicated

"Sneakin' Suspicion" (3:50)
"Paradise" (4:03)
"Nothin' Shakin' (But the Leaves on the Trees)" (Cirino Colacrai, Eddie Fontaine, Johnny Gluck, Diane Lampert) (3:28)
"Time and the Devil" (2:59)
"Lights Out" (Seth David, Mac Rebennack) (1:54)
"Lucky Seven" (Lew Lewis) (2:46)
"All My Love" (3:47)
"You'll Be Mine" (Willie Dixon) (3:17)
"Walking on the Edge" (3:39)
"Hey Mama, Keep Your Big Mouth Shut" (Ellas McDaniel)

Personnel
Dr. Feelgood
Lee Brilleaux - vocals, guitar, harmonica, slide guitar
Wilko Johnson - guitar, backing vocals, lead vocals (2,4) 
John B. Sparks - bass guitar, backing vocals
The Big Figure - drums, percussion, backing vocals
with:
 Tim Hinkley - keyboards
Technical
Bert de Coteaux - producer
Pat Moran - audio engineer
John Dent - mastering
Paul Henry - design
 Gered Mankowitz - photography

References

External links

1977 albums
United Artists Records albums
Dr. Feelgood (band) albums
Albums recorded at Rockfield Studios